Acacia caesariata is a shrub of the genus Acacia and the subgenus Plurinerves. It is native to an area in the Wheatbelt  region of Western Australia.

Description
It has hairy and slightly ribbed branchelts that have persistent stipules with a length of .Like most species of Acacia it has phyllodes rather than true leaves. It blooms from August to September and produces yellow flowers.

Description
It has a disjunct distribution from around Kununoppin in the north to Lake Grace in the south where it grows in gritty clay and loam soils as a part of Eucalyptus woodland and mallee scrub communities.

See also
 List of Acacia species

References

caesariata
Acacias of Western Australia
Taxa named by Bruce Maslin